Harriet King (born September 22, 1935) is an American fencer. She competed in the women's individual and team foil events at the 1960, 1964, 1968 and 1972 Summer Olympics.

References

External links
 

1935 births
Living people
American female foil fencers
Olympic fencers of the United States
Fencers at the 1960 Summer Olympics
Fencers at the 1964 Summer Olympics
Fencers at the 1968 Summer Olympics
Fencers at the 1972 Summer Olympics
Sportspeople from New York City
Pan American Games medalists in fencing
Pan American Games gold medalists for the United States
Pan American Games silver medalists for the United States
Fencers at the 1963 Pan American Games
Medalists at the 1963 Pan American Games
21st-century American women